See also :Category:African-American abolitionists

A
 William G. Allen (c. 1820 – 1 May 1888)
 Osborne Perry Anderson

B
 Henry Walton Bibb
 Mary E. Bibb
 James Bradley
 Henry Box Brown
 William Wells Brown

C
 John Anthony Copeland Jr.
 Ellen and William Craft
 Paul Cuffe (January 17, 1759 – September 7, 1817)

D
 Thomas Dalton
 Moses Dickson
 Charles Remond Douglass
 Frederick Douglass (c. February 1817 – February 20, 1895)
 Sarah Mapps Douglass
 Thomas Downing (restauranteur)

F
 James Forten
 Margaretta Forten

G
 Eliza Ann Gardner
 Henry Highland Garnet
 Mifflin Wistar Gibbs
 Rev. Samuel Green
 Shields Green
 Charlotte Forten Grimké

H
 Frances Harper
 Lewis Hayden
 Felix Holbrook

J
 Harriet Jacobs
 John S. Jacobs
 Thomas James

L
 Charles Henry Langston
 John Mercer Langston
 Lewis Sheridan Leary
 Jermain Wesley Loguen

M
 Mary Meachum
 Henry Moxley
 Anna Murray-Douglass

N
 William Cooper Nell
 Dangerfield Newby

P
 John Parker
 Susan Paul
 James W.C. Pennington
 Gabriel Prosser
 Harriet Forten Purvis
 Robert Purvis

R
 Peter Randolph
Charles Bennett Ray
Charlotte B. Ray
 Charles L. Reason
 Hetty Reckless
 Charles Lenox Remond
 John Swett Rock
 David Ruggles
 John Brown Russwurm (October 1, 1799 – June 9, 1851)

S
 Dred Scott (c. 1799 – September 17, 1858)
 Benjamin "Pap" Singleton
 James McCune Smith
 Lucy Stanton
 Austin Steward (1793 – February 15, 1869)
 Maria W. Stewart
 William Still

T
 Sojourner Truth (c. 1797 – November 26, 1883)
 Harriet Tubman (c. March 1822 – March 10, 1913)
 Nat Turner (October 2, 1800 – November 11, 1831)

V
 George Boyer Vashon
 Denmark Vesey (c.1767 – July 2, 1822)

W
 David Walker (September 28, 1796 – August 6, 1830)
 William Whipper (February 22, 1804 – March 9, 1876)
 Theodore S. Wright (1797–1847)

See also
 Abolitionism in the United States
 :Category:African-American abolitionists
 John Brown's raiders#Black participation
List of notable opponents of slavery
Slavery in the United States
Texas Revolution
Underground Railroad
United States Colored Troops

Notes

Abolitionists
African American Abolitionists
Slavery-related lists